Flevo can refer to:
Lake Flevo, a former lake (now the Zuiderzee), Netherlands.
Flevoland, a province in the Netherlands
The Flevo Festival, a Dutch Christian music festival